Tong is a ward in the metropolitan borough of the City of Bradford, West Yorkshire, England.  It contains 48 listed buildings that are recorded in the National Heritage List for England.  Of these, two are listed at Grade I, the highest of the three grades, five are at Grade II*, the middle grade, and the others are at Grade II, the lowest grade.  The ward is southeast of the centre of Bradford and contains the district of Bierley, which is effectively a suburb of the city, the outlying villages of Tong and Holme, and surrounding areas.  The village of Tong contains the two Grade I listed buildings, a large hall, and a church, both with associated listed buildings.  Most of the other listed buildings are houses and cottages, farmhouses and farm buildings.  The rest include a set of stocks, another church, public houses, a former school, a former cinema, a pinfold, pump, troughs and a smithy, and a war memorial.


Key

Buildings

References

Citations

Sources

 

Lists of listed buildings in West Yorkshire
Listed